Abbott Run is a de facto river in the U.S. state of Massachusetts and Rhode Island. It flows approximately 10 miles (16 km).

Course
The river rises from Miscoe Lake on the border of Wrentham, Massachusetts and Cumberland, Rhode Island, then flows south through Cumberland, Rhode Island where it provides water to numerous ponds, including Diamond Hill Reservoir, Arnold Mills Reservoir and Rawson Pond. It then flows back into Massachusetts and flows south through North Attleborough, past the village of Adamsdale. From there, the river flows back into Rhode Island and continues through Cumberland, providing water to Robin Hollow and Happy Hollow Ponds before flowing into the Blackstone River at the village of Valley Falls.

Crossings
Below is a list of all crossings over Abbott Run. The list starts at the headwaters and heads downstream.
Wrentham
West Street (MA 121)
Cumberland
Sumner Brown Road
Reservoir Road
Sneech Pond Road
Nate Whipple Highway (RI 120)
Rawson Road
Howard Road
Interstate 295
North Attleborough
Hunts Bridge Road
Cushman Road
Mendon Road
Cumberland
Dexter Street (RI 123)
Mill Street

Tributaries
Burnt Swamp Brook and the Millers River are the only two named tributaries of Abbott Run, though it has many unnamed streams that also feed it.

See also
List of rivers in Massachusetts
List of rivers in Rhode Island
Millers River

References
Maps from the United States Geological Survey

Rivers of Norfolk County, Massachusetts
Rivers of Bristol County, Massachusetts
Rivers of Providence County, Rhode Island
Cumberland, Rhode Island
Rivers of Massachusetts
Rivers of Rhode Island
Tributaries of Providence River